Mick Pavone (born 6 October 1951) is a former Australian rules footballer who played with South Melbourne in the Victorian Football League (VFL). Mick was the 8,240th player to appear in the AFL and the 975th player to appear for South Melbourne.

Notes

External links 

Living people
1951 births
Australian rules footballers from Victoria (Australia)
Sydney Swans players